Tsubaichi Dam  is an earthfill dam located in Hyogo Prefecture in Japan. The dam is used for irrigation. The catchment area of the dam is 2.7 km2. The dam impounds about 9  ha of land when full and can store 1070 thousand cubic meters of water. The construction of the dam was started on 1969 and completed in 1971.

See also
List of dams in Japan

References

Dams in Hyogo Prefecture